Kalne is an inhabited locality in Ukraine and it may refer to:

 Kalne, Skole Raion, a village in Skole Raion, Lviv Oblast
 Kalne, Kozova Raion, a village in Kozova Raion, Ternopil Oblast
 Kalne, Zboriv Raion, village in Zboriv Raion, Ternopil Oblast